Tumsa Nahin Dekha (English: Saw nobody like you) is a 1957 Indian Hindi language romance drama film, produced by Sashadhar Mukherjee while written and directed by Nasir Hussain, of Filmistan Pvt. Ltd. The film marked Hussain's evolution into a director. He had written films such as Munimji and Paying Guest.

The film was conceived as a star vehicle for its heroine Ameeta, who was the protégée of Filmistan Studios owner Tolaram Jalan. Much care was taken with her make-up, wardrobe and lighting. Much of the film's extensive publicity was also built around the actress.

The film's huge success at the box office made the then-struggling Shammi Kapoor an overnight sensation instead. This was the film in which he developed his own individual look and youthful style, and was his first light-hearted musical and its success helped move him to acting in this genre. The film also stars the popular villain and character actor Pran. Its music is by O.P. Nayyar and lyrics by Majrooh Sultanpuri.

The film was originally offered to Dev Anand, but he declined, due to which Shammi Kapoor was cast. However, the director Nasir Hussain was in a quandary as he had already read the script to Dev Anand and Vyjayanthimala, but Mukerji prevailed and he also replaced Vyjayanthimala with Ameeta, who was the protégée of Filmistan Studios owner Tolaram Jalan. The film's original lyricist was Sahir, who wrote the title song, but he too opted out and Majrooh Sultanpuri took his place.

Plot
Twenty years ago, after killing his friend, Sardar Rajpal flees from his hometown in Shillong and re-locates to the rural area of Assam along with his adopted daughter Meena. He asks his wife Kamla, to send their son Shankar, so that he can employ him and get him married to Meena. Shankar arrives and he is welcomed by Sardar, who employs him and introduces him to Meena. A few days later, another young man shows up at his door claiming to be Kamla's son. A baffled Sardar also welcomes him, and puts both the young men under observation in order to find who the real Shankar is. The question remains: why would anyone want to impersonate Shankar, and what will happen to Sardar himself after the Police catch up with him for killing his friend 20 years ago?

Cast
 Shammi Kapoor as Shankar Bhat
 Ameeta as Meena
 Pran as Sohan
 Raj Mehra as Vishnu
 B. M. Vyas as Gopal / Sardar Rajpal
 Sheela Vaz as Seema
 Kanu Roy as Bhola
 M. B. Shetty as Bhola's henchman
 Ram Avtar as Johnny
 Shilendra Kumar Singh as Shankar's chacha (uncle)
 Anjali Devi as Kamla
 Rajendra
 S. L. Puri
 Harbans Darshan M. Arora as Amarnath
 Tina Misquitta as Actress
 Bela Bose as a dancer in song 'Aaye he door se'

Soundtrack

References

External links
 

1957 films
1950s Hindi-language films
Films directed by Nasir Hussain
Films scored by O. P. Nayyar